Rosemary & Thyme is a British television cosy mystery thriller series starring Felicity Kendal and Pam Ferris as gardening detectives Rosemary Boxer and Laura Thyme. The show began on ITV in 2003. The third series ended in August 2007. The theme is murder mysteries in the setting of professional gardening jobs. It was created by Brian Eastman to entertain his wife, Christabel Albery, who is an avid gardener. The show was directed by Brian Farnham (10 episodes, 2003–2006), Simon Langton (8 episodes, 2004–2006), Tom Clegg (3 episodes, 2003) and Gwennan Sage (1 episode, 2004). Clive Exton, who helped create the show, contributed 10 of the 22 scripts.

Plot
A cosy mystery series set in beautiful British and European gardens, Rosemary & Thyme features two women brought together by a sudden death who discover their shared love of the soil. Being gardeners means that they overhear secrets and dig up clues which lead them to handle floral problems, solve crimes and capture criminals.

Main characters
 Laura Thyme (Pam Ferris) is a former police officer and recently broke up with her husband, who cheated on her with a younger woman. She is an avid gardener with a lot of practical knowledge about plants and garden design.

Rosemary Boxer (Felicity Kendal) has a doctorate in plant pathology and was a University of Malmesbury lecturer in applied horticulture for eighteen years, before her academic position was suddenly and sneakily removed (which pushes her to punch her ex-boss, a former beau, who fired her underhandedly). Rosemary owns a 1980 Land Rover Series III which is somewhat dilapidated and has occasional breakdowns.

The series' title was taken from the English poem "Scarborough Fayre".

While many guests starred, only two people (other than Kendal and Ferris) have appeared in more than one episode, Ryan Philpott and Daisy Dunlop, who appeared as Laura Thyme's children Matthew and Helena.

Series Overview

Episodes

Series 1 (2003)

Series 2 (2004)

Series 3 (2005-07)

Finale

On 12 May 2006, ITV announced that the show was to be axed as part of a major refresh in ITV1's programming. The final two episodes of series three ("Racquet Espanol" and "Enter Two Gardeners") were not aired with the rest of the series during 2005-06. They were eventually broadcast in late July and early August 2007.

Because of the outdoor nature of the show and the brevity of the British summer, it became the practice to set two episodes of each series in overseas locations. Two stories were already ready for shooting in Portugal when changes in production personnel caused delays. By the time that shooting was rescheduled, some actors were otherwise committed, and the ITV Network Centre was left with no option but to cancel filming for a fourth series.

Novels
Three novelisations, credited to series creator Brian Eastman and ghostwritten by crime writer Rebecca Tope, were published in Britain by Allison and Busby and in Australia by Hardie Grant Books:

 And No Birds Sing (published in 2004, based on the pilot episode)
 The Tree of Death (published in 2005, based on the final episode of Series 1)
 Memory of Water (published in 2006, based on the feature-length opening episode of Series 2)

Related media

Composed and conducted by Christopher Gunning, a CD of incidental music and the opening theme (performed by John Williams) from the first two series of Rosemary & Thyme.

"The Case of the Dead Wait", by Peter Lovesey (January 2007 Ellery Queen's Mystery Magazine)

DVD releases

References

External links
"Official Carnival Films presskit"

Website for Rosemary and Thyme Costume designer, series II and III

2003 British television series debuts
2007 British television series endings
2000s British drama television series
British crime television series
English-language television shows
ITV mystery shows
Television series by ITV Studios
Television series by Yorkshire Television
Fictional amateur detectives
Television duos
Television shows set in Hertfordshire
Television series created by Clive Exton